Siphonodendron is an extinct genus of colonial rugose corals common during the Carboniferous period. In fossil form it now appears as a white or brown mass of short spaghetti-like threads, usually flattened during distortion of the embedding limestone.  It is in the sub-class Hexacorallia of corals with sixfold symmetry.

See also

 List of prehistoric hexacorals

Rugosa
Prehistoric Anthozoa genera
Paleozoic life of British Columbia